Waste management laws govern the transport, treatment, storage, and disposal of all manner of waste, including municipal solid waste, hazardous waste, and nuclear waste, among many other types. Waste laws are generally designed to minimize or eliminate the uncontrolled dispersal of waste materials into the environment in a manner that may cause ecological or biological harm, and include laws designed to reduce the generation of waste and promote or mandate waste recycling. Regulatory efforts include identifying and categorizing waste types and mandating transport, treatment, storage, and disposal practices.

Waste determination 
Waste determination is the process by which a particular material is classified as a "waste" subject to regulation. The question can become quite complicated, as for example determining whether a some material is "hazardous waste" under the U.S. Resource Conservation and Recovery Act.

Determination of whether a material constitutes a particular waste type may govern the manner in which the material must be handled from that point forward. For example, in the United States, non-hazardous municipal solid waste may be sent to a landfill, while used motor oil is deemed hazardous and cannot be dumped in landfills, but rather is subject to more stringent handling, storage, treatment, and disposal requirements.

Many other wastes may have their own individual definitions and unique handling requirements. In each case a "waste stream" may be identified - waste is generated when a previously useful item is discarded or abandoned, and then may flow through various defined treatment, recycling, and storage areas before arriving at a final designated disposal site.

Disposal standards 
Disposal standards govern the permissibility, method, and location of disposal of a particular waste. Such standards may be designed to protect human health and comfort, and environmental values. A variety of methods exist to control disposal.

Waste disposal may be restricted entirely via a disposal ban. The most common and widespread such standard is a prohibition on littering. Where a jurisdiction has authorized a specific place or system for trash collection, deposition or abandonment of trash elsewhere may be subject to civil or criminal penalties. Other more specific disposal bans - from mandating that paint not be poured down drains, to specifying national repositories for radioactive waste - all act to govern the final resting place of various wastes. Still other wastes may be required to be separated for recycling, rather than disposal. All of these prohibitions are, in a sense, conditional, in that they do not outright ban the disposal of the material, but rather restrict the disposal location.

Waste disposal also may be restricted conditionally by requiring that a waste be treated in a specific fashion before it may be disposed of at a particular location. One such program is the United States Environmental Protection Agency's Land Disposal Restrictions under the Resource Conservation and Recovery Act Subtitle C hazardous waste management program. These rules restrict the land disposal (placement in landfills, primarily) of hazardous waste without prior approved programs. The "disposal prohibition" mandates that hazardous waste cannot be disposed on land until it is treated to meet specified characteristics (acceptable ignitability, corrosivity, reactivity, and toxicity), or is treated by specified approved treatment methods. The "dilution prohibition" proscribes adding large amounts of water, soil, or non-hazardous waste in order to avoid specified treatment. The "storage prohibition" allows waste to be stored only for the purposes of accumulating for treatment, rather than simply stored indefinitely to avoid treatment.

Specific standards may also be adopted regarding the construction and operation of waste disposal facilities. Landfills, for example, may be required to meet location restrictions to avoid geological faults or wetlands; to install liner systems and collection systems to minimize groundwater contamination from leachate; to adopt operation policies that minimize dust and other nuisances; to install methane removal or collection systems to eliminate landfill gas; to be covered and otherwise closed upon decommissioning; and to operate environmental monitoring systems to ensure compliance.

Around the world

International law 
International law includes agreements related to international transport and disposal of hazardous waste:

China 
China RoHS

European Union 
Battery Directive
Landfill Directive
Waste Framework Directive (as revised, 20 October 2008) 
Waste Incineration Directive
WEEE Directive
 Hazardous Waste Regulations (2005), revised 2009

United Kingdom
UK waste legislation is derived predominantly from EU governance and transposed into UK law via Statutory Instruments.

Animal By-Products Regulations (ABPR)
Best practicable environmental option (BPEO)
Certificate of Technical Competence (COTC)
Control of Pollution Act
Environment Act 1995
Environmental Impact Assessment
Environmental Protection Act 1990
Landfill Allowance Trading Scheme (LATS)
Landfill in the UK
Landfill tax
Landfill tax regulations
Statutory recycling targets
Waste (England and Wales) Regulations 2011, as amended in 2012, transposing the Waste Framework Directive into UK law
Waste Management Licensing Regulations

UK waste management facilities register for one or more of 28 standard permits, may opt for an exemption from licensing or complete a bespoke permit.  Persons or organisations wishing to transport waste (other than their own) must purchase a waste carrier license. Producers of hazardous wastes are required (where they produce in excess of 500 kilograms per annum) to register as a hazardous waste producer.

The 2011 regulations were amended in 2012 following legal claims raised by the Campaign for Real Recycling, who argued that they did not correctly transpose the directive into the law of England and Wales. On 6 March 2013, Mr Justice Hickinbottom ruled that the 2012 amended regulations did now fulfil the requirements of the European Commission’s revised Waste Framework Directive.

The EU–UK Trade and Cooperation Agreement of 2020 includes "reciprocal commitments" by each party "not to reduce the level of environmental or climate protection or fail to enforce its laws in a manner that has an effect on trade", which will include laws related to waste management.

United States 
Resource Conservation and Recovery Act (RCRA) – One of the main pieces of Legislation regarding municipal solid waste, hazardous wastes, and disposal issues.
Comprehensive Environmental Response, Compensation, and Liability Act (CERCLA) "Superfund"
Medical Waste Tracking Act
National Environmental Policy Act (NEPA) – Established the Environmental Protection Agency, set out requirements for Environmental Impact Reporting for various kinds of development.

US Regulatory bodies include:
United States Environmental Protection Agency (EPA) - regulates generation and disposal of hazardous waste
United States Department of Transportation (DOT) - regulates transportation of hazardous waste
Nuclear Regulatory Commission (NRC) - regulates nuclear waste

In addition to laws implementing or advancing portions of the US laws, some US states have enacted notable laws on other waste and environmental subjects.
California Proposition 65 "The Safe Drinking Water and Toxic Enforcement Act of 1986" - a 1986 California initiative prohibiting the discharge of toxic substances into drinking water sources
Electronic Waste Recycling Act - a 2003 California law regarding disposal of consumer electronic wastes

References 

Waste law